Duchess of Scania or Duchess of Skåne may refer to:

 Louise of the Netherlands, Princess Louise, Duchess of Scania (1850–1859) as consort of Prince Carl, later Queen of Sweden and Norway
 Princess Margaret of Connaught, Duchess of Scania (1905–1920) as consort of Prince Gustaf Adolf (later King Gustaf VI Adolf of Sweden)
 Louise Mountbatten, Duchess of Scania (1923–1950) as consort of Prince Gustaf Adolf (later King Gustaf VI Adolf of Sweden), later Queen of Sweden

See also
 Scania (disambiguation)
 Skåne (disambiguation)